Chris Phillips (1956–2007) was a Chief Executive of Scottish Widows (a life, pensions and investment company located in Edinburgh, Scotland) who lost his life in a mountaineering accident.

Phillips was educated at Sexey's Grammar School and Oxford University. His first job was as Policy Advisor to the Social Democratic Party. He joined Scottish Widows from Royal London Asset Management. At the time of his death he was on gardening leave while waiting to join Morley as their CEO. He close to spend that time walking the Camino de Santiago, a pilgrim's way, to the shrine of the apostle St. James the Great in northwestern Spain. He was found in deep snow near Roncesvalles.

References

1956 births
2007 deaths
People educated at Sexey's Grammar School
Alumni of the University of Oxford
British chairpersons of corporations
Mountaineering deaths
Social Democratic Party (UK)
20th-century British businesspeople